Snow is a children's picture book by Uri Shulevitz.  It received a  Caldecott Honor in 1999. It also won the Charlotte Zolotow Award in 1999.

Description
This book uses lively watercolor and pen-and-ink illustrations to show the transformation of the city as snow falls. The beginning pages use a dull and bleak palette. By the end of the book the previously dull city is covered in snow and looks magical and bright.

Plot
It is a dull and grey city until the first snowflakes start to fall. No one thinks those few flakes will amount to much except for a boy and his dog. He believes that it will snow, despite the numerous predictions from adults, the television, and the radio that it will not. As the snow begins to pile up, disgruntled adults rush home, leaving the boy and his dog to joyfully enjoy the snow.

Themes
The snow is a metaphor for "the faith young children possess in the face of an adult world lacking in vision and understanding."

References

American picture books
Children's fiction books
1998 children's books
Caldecott Honor-winning works